Fusus gracilis is a species of sea snail, a marine gastropod mollusc in the family Fasciolariidae, the spindle snails, the tulip snails and their allies.

References

Gastropods described in 1845
Gracilis